Nam Wan Kok is a cape in the southeast corner of Tsing Yi Island, Hong Kong. Its coast was reclaimed and became Container Terminal 9. The Nam Wan Tunnel and Stonecutters Bridge meet there.

The Chinese name of Nam Wan Kok means the cape of Tai Nam Wan, a bay beside the cape.

Tsing Yi
Capes of Hong Kong